Paragaleodiscus is a monotypic genus of Galeodid camel spiders, first described by Aleksei Birula in 1941. Its single species, Paragaleodiscus aflagellatus is distributed in Yemen.

References 

Solifugae
Arachnid genera
Monotypic arachnid genera
Spiders described in 1941